Alexander Christian Irvine (born March 22, 1969) is an American fantasy and sci-fi author.

Biography
Irvine was born on March 22, 1969. Irvine first gained attention with his Locus Award-winning 2002 novel A Scattering of Jades (which also won the Crawford Award in 2003) and the stories that would form the 2003 collection Unintended Consequences. He has also published the Grail Quest novel One King, One Soldier (2004), and the World War II-era historical fantasy The Narrows (2005). He released a collection of thirteen short stories called Pictures from an Expedition in 2006. Buyout, a novel set in 2041, was published by Random House in 2009.

In addition to his original works, Irvine has published Have Robot, Will Travel (2004), a novel set in Isaac Asimov's positronic robot milieu; and Batman: Inferno (2006), about the DC Comics superhero. His novel The Ultimates: Against All Enemies, about the Marvel Comics superhero team was published by Pocket Books in September 2007. He also wrote the Vertigo Encyclopedia. As well as writing about comics he has written a number of comic book series, including one featuring Daimon Hellstrom for the Marvel Comics imprint MAX, Daredevil Noir, and "Iron Man: The Rapture."

He has worked on Alternate Reality Games including The Beast and I Love Bees and is the writer of the Facebook game Marvel: Avengers Alliance.

Irvine has a B.A. from the University of Michigan (1991), an M.A. from the University of Maine (1996), and a Ph.D. from the University of Denver (2003). From 2005-11, he was an assistant professor of English at the University of Maine. He also worked for a time as a reporter at the Portland Phoenix. He is married with twins, a boy and girl, and two younger children. He was until recently a professor at the University of Southern Maine.

Irvine appeared on Jeopardy! in 2015, winning one day to win $26,000.

Bibliography

Novels
A Scattering of Jades (2002)
One King, One Soldier (2004)
The Narrows (2005)
The Life of Riley (2005)  
Buyout (2009)
 
 

Licensed work
Have Robot, Will Travel (2004)
Batman: Inferno (October 2006)
The Ultimates: Against All Enemies (2007)
The Supernatural Book of Monsters, Spirits, Demons, and Ghouls (September 2007)
Supernatural: John Winchester's Journal (February 2009)
Iron Man: Virus (January 2010)
Iron Man 2 - The Novelization (April 2010)
Transformers: Exodus (June 2010)
Transformers: Exiles (2011)
The Seal of Karga Kul: A Dungeons & Dragons Novel (December 2010)
Star Wars: Mandorla (Cancelled)
The Adventures of Tintin: A Novel (Movie Tie-In) (Little, Brown Books for Young Readers (November 2011)
The Secret Journal of Ichabod Crane (2014)
Pacific Rim - The Novelization (2013)
Phase One: Captain America: The First Avenger (2014)
Phase One: Iron Man (2014)
Batman: Arkham Knight - The Riddler's Gambit (Prequel to Batman: Arkham Knight) (June 2015)
Marvel Superheroes: Secret Wars (2015)
Phase One: Marvel's The Avengers (2015)
Phase One: The Incredible Hulk (2015)
Phase One: Thor (2015)
Phase Two: Marvel's Guardians of the Galaxy (2015)
Independence Day: Resurgence: The Novelization (2016)
 Tom Clancy's The Division: New York Collapse (2016)
Phase Two: Marvel's Ant-Man (2016)
Power Rangers: The Official Movie Novelization (2017)
Pacific Rim: Uprising - The Novelization (2018)
Tom Clancy's The Division: Broken Dawn (2019)

Short fiction 

Stories

Comics
Hellstorm: Son of Satan -- Equinox #1-5 (art by Russell Braun) (Marvel MAX, October 2006-February 2007)
Daredevil Noir: Liar's Poker #1-4 (art by Tomm Coker)  (Marvel, April–July 2009)
The Murder of King Tut #1-5 (adapted from the novel by James Patterson, art by Christopher Mitten and Ron Randall) (IDW, June–October 2010)
Iron Man: The Rapture #1-4 (art by Lan Medina) (Marvel Knights, November 2010-January 2011)
Dungeons & Dragons: Dark Sun #1-5 (art by Peter Bergting) (IDW, January 2011-May 2011)
Dark Sun: Ianto's Tomb (August 14, 2012)
Deus Ex: The Children's Crusade #1-5 (art by John Aggs) (Titan, February–June 2016)
Deus Ex Universe: The Dawning Darkness (art by John Aggs) (Titan, August 2016)

Non-fiction

The Comic Book Story of Baseball: The Heroes, Hustlers, and History-making Swings (and Misses) of America's National Pastime (art by Tomm Coker and C.P. Smith) (Ten-Speed Press, 2019)

Screenwriting
 Transformers: Robots in Disguise (2015)

Awards and honors
As listed in Contemporary Authors.

Lennie Isaacs Memorial Award, Clarion Writer's Workshop, 1993
Steve Grady Poetry Award, University of Maine, 1995
Albert Morton Turner Essay Prize, University of Maine, 1995
Technology in the First-Year English Classroom Award, University of Denver, 1999
Travel and dissertation research grant, ColRoMorA Family Foundation, 1999
Best Web site of the Year, Entertainment Weekly, for The Beast, 2001
Best Ideas of the Year, The New York Times, for The Beast, 2001
Pushcart Prize nomination for "Snapdragons", 2002
Best First Novel, Locus, for A Scattering of Jades, 2003
Best First Novel, International Horror Guild, for A Scattering of Jades, 2003
Crawford Award for best first novel, for A Scattering of Jades, 2003
International Association for the Fantastic in the Arts, for A Scattering of Jades, 2003
New England Press Award for investigative journalism, 2004
International Game Developers Association award for innovation, for I Love Bees, 2005
Critic's choice award, 48-hour Film Project, for "Music Box", 2006
Year's Best Science Fiction and Fantasy, for "Wizard's Six", 2007

Notes

References

1969 births
Living people
21st-century American novelists
American comics writers
American fantasy writers
American male novelists
Jeopardy! contestants
The Magazine of Fantasy & Science Fiction people
People from Ypsilanti, Michigan
Novelists from Maine
Novelists from Michigan
University of Michigan alumni
21st-century American male writers